3103 Eger is an Apollo and Mars-crosser asteroid that was discovered in 1982, by Miklós Lovas. It was named after the city of Eger, Hungary. It has an albedo of 0.64, making it a highly reflective asteroid.

Description 

It has made and will continue to make many close approaches to Earth. Its closest approach occurred on 6 August 1996, when the asteroid passed  from Earth.

3103 Eger is the only asteroid besides 4 Vesta identified as the parent body for specific meteorites.  4 Vesta is the parent body for Howardite, Eucrite, and Diogenite meteorites, while 3103 Eger is the parent body for Aubrite meteorites. In this characteristic 3103 Eger is related spectroscopically to the 434 Hungaria type asteroids, which are a Hirayama-family of orbital types, and E-type asteroids which form a spectroscopical type.

See also 
 Aubrite
 Hungaria family
 (144898) 2004 VD17
 44 Nysa
 2867 Šteins

References

External links
 Mineralogy of Asteroids
 Relation between E-asteroids, 3103 Eger and 434 Hungaria
 Relations between E-type asteroids 2867 Šteins, a target of the Rosetta mission, and 3103 Eger
 3103 Eger in the Ondrejov NEO program
 Benner, et al. - Radar Detection of Near-Earth Asteroids 2062 Aten, 2101 Adonis, 3103 Eger, 4544 Xanthus, and 1992 QN (1997)
 
 
 

003103
Named minor planets
003103
Earth-crossing asteroids
003103
19820120